Atlanta is an unincorporated community in Sussex County, Delaware, United States. Atlanta is located on Delaware Route 18 near the Maryland border.

The Melson House was added to the National Register of Historic Places in 1978.

References

Unincorporated communities in Sussex County, Delaware
Unincorporated communities in Delaware